Jeske is a surname. Notable people with the surname include:

Daniel R. Jeske, American statistician
Frank Jeske (1960–1994), German footballer
George Jeske (1891–1951), American screenwriter, director, and actor.
Hugo Jeske (1873–1920), American politicians 
Ludmila Jeske-Choińska-Mikorska (1849–1898), Polish singer and composer
Susan Jeske (born 1961), American singer and first Ms. America 
Teodor Jeske-Choiński (1854–1920), Polish intellectual, writer and historian, literature critic